WIKS (101.9 FM) is an urban contemporary-formatted broadcast radio station licensed to New Bern, North Carolina. The station is owned by Curtis Media Group. WIKS is an affiliate of the Steve Harvey Morning Show.

History
The 101.9 FM frequency in New Bern signed on with an Album-oriented Rock format in August 1977 as WRBK ("K101"). Due to the nature of its frequency at 101.9 and the advent of digital tuners, the slogan was changed to "K102" in the summer of 1978. In August 1979, the station flipped to a country music format, as WAZZ ("Country Ways").

By 1986, the station would become "Kiss 102" with the WIKS call letters and an Urban Contemporary format. Transmitting power increased to 100,000 watts. Rap and hip-hop music was introduced in the 1990s, as WIKS became a full modern mainstream urban station by 1998. In 1997 WIKS picked up competition from the 92.3 Frequency when WQSL adopted a rhythmic top 40 format as "The Beat of Carolina". WIKS responded by tweaking its format to Urban Adult Contemporary station in 2003, though they eventually returned to their current format.

On February 2, 2017, Beasley Media Group announced that it would sell its six stations and four translators in the Greenville-New Bern-Jacksonville market, including WIKS, to Curtis Media Group for $11 million to reduce the company's debt. The sale was completed on May 1, 2017.N

Translators
WIKS feeds low-powered FM translators, by way of their HD2 subchannel. "Beach, Boogie and Blues" features a beach music/rhythmic oldies format, originating from sister stations WELS-FM and WNCT.

References

External links
WIKS Website
BeachBoogieandBlues.com (HD2 programming)

IKS
Radio stations established in 1979
Urban contemporary radio stations in the United States
New Bern, North Carolina
1979 establishments in North Carolina